Paul van Dyk is a German DJ and record producer.

Albums

Studio albums

Other albums
2020: Escape Reality

Soundtrack albums

Remix albums

Compilation albums
1997: Perspective - A Collection Of Remixes 1992–1997
1998: Vorsprung Dyk Technik: Remixes 92-98, BPI: Silver
1999: Paul van Dyk's Nervous Tracks
2002: Global
2004: Perfect Remixes Vol. 2
2008: 10 Years GMF Compilation
2009: Volume(GER #18), (UK #34), (AUT #69) (Top Heatseekers #1)

DJ Mixes
1993: X-Mix-1- The MFS Trip
1999: 60 Minute Mix
2001: The Politics of Dancing (FIN - #30)
2003: Mixmag (Mixmag DJ Mix)
2005: The Politics of Dancing 2
2005: Paul van Dyk (subtitled Exclusive 12 Track Trance Mix) (Mixmag DJ Mix)
2005: Paul van Dyk DJ Mag Compilation
2008: Cream Ibiza 2008
2009: Vonyc Sessions 2009
2010: Gatecrasher Anthems, BPI: Silver
2010: Vonyc Sessions 2010
2010: Paul van Dyk Presents: 10 of Years VANDIT
2011: Vonyc Sessions 2011
2012: Vonyc Sessions 2012
2013: Vonyc Sessions 2013
2014: Paul van Dyk Presents: VANDIT Records Miami 2014

Video albums

Extended plays

Singles

Music videos
My World
Pump This Party
Forbidden Fruit
For an Angel
Another Way
Tell Me Why (The Riddle) (featuring Saint Etienne)
We Are Alive
Nothing But You (featuring Hemstock & Jennings)
Time of Our Lives (featuring Vega 4)
Crush (featuring Second Sun)
Wir Sind Wir (featuring Peter Heppner)
The Other Side (featuring Wayne Jackson)
White Lies (Paul van Dyk song) (featuring Jessica Sutta)
Let Go (featuring Rea Garvey)
For An Angel 2009
Home (featuring Johnny McDaid)
Verano (featuring Austin Leeds)
Eternity (featuring Adam Young)
The Ocean (featuring Arty)
I Don't Deserve You  (featuring Plumb)
I Don't Deserve You  (featuring Plumb) (Seven Lions Remix)
Crush (featuring Second Sun) (Las Salinas Remix)
Come With Me (We Are One 2014) (with Ummet Ozcan) 
Only In A Dream (with Jessus & Adham Ashraf featuring Tricia McTeague)
Louder (Lyrics) (with Roger Shah featuring Daphne Khoo)
Lights (featuring Sue McLaren)
Berlinition (with Chris Bekker & Chris Montana)
Touched By Heaven
Stronger Together
I Am Alive
Music Rescues Me
Duality

Co-productions

The Visions Of Shiva (with Cosmic Baby)
1992 Perfect Day
1993 How Much Can You Take?
Dolfin' (with Paul Schmitz-Moormann and Stephan Fischer)
1993 Elation (Abstractmix)
Tilt vs. Paul van Dyk
1996 Rendezvous (Quadrophonic Mix)
BT
1997 Flaming June (BT and PvD Mix)
DJ's United (with Armin van Buuren and Paul Oakenfold)
2010 Remember Love
Christian Burns and Paul van Dyk
2013 We Are Tonight
Sue McLaren, Farhad Mohavi and Paul van Dyk
2016 Together Again
Chris Bekker, Chris Montana and Paul van Dyk
2016 Berlinition
Giuseppe Ottaviani, Paul van Dyk and Sue McLaren
2016 Miracle
Alex M.O.R.P.H. and Paul van Dyk
2016 We Are
Will Atkinson and Paul van Dyk
2020 Awakening

Remixes
"Poor Choice of Words" — Hans Zimmer & James Newton Howard
"Still Alive" — Lisa Miskovsky
"What Goes Around... Comes Around" — Justin Timberlake
"Gimme More" — Britney Spears
"1998" — Binary Finary
"Burn It Down" — Linkin Park
"Losing My Mind" — Tritonal and Haliene

References

Electronic music discographies
Discographies of German artists